St. Mark's Evangelical Lutheran Church is a historic Evangelical Lutheran church at 326 Main Street in Middleburgh, Schoharie County, New York.  It is a rectangular, gable roofed, brick structure built in 1856 in the Italianate style.  It features an engaged center brick entrance / bell tower with open belfry.

It was listed on the National Register of Historic Places in 2006.

References

External links

Lutheran churches in New York (state)
Churches on the National Register of Historic Places in New York (state)
Italianate architecture in New York (state)
Churches completed in 1856
19th-century Lutheran churches in the United States
Churches in Schoharie County, New York
National Register of Historic Places in Schoharie County, New York
Italianate church buildings in the United States